Copromorpha mistharnis is a moth in the Copromorphidae family. It is found in the Philippines (Luzon).

References

Natural History Museum Lepidoptera generic names catalog

Copromorphidae
Moths described in 1968